The Kingdom of Khana  or Kingdom of Hana (end of 18th century BC – middle of 17th century BC) was the Syrian Kingdom from Hana Land located in the middle Euphrates region north of Mari which included the ancient city of Terqa. The kingdom emerged during the decline of the First Babylonian Dynasty. A newer view is that only the initial six rulers lived during that time and after an interregnum, Khana re-emerged in the Middle Babylonian period under the last six kings. The Low Chronology dating scheme for Hana has gained much support. It was located in the middle Euphrates close to the junction of Khabur River. Its capital was the town of Terqa.

Location 

The kingdom of Hana was located on territories formerly ruled by the sovereigns of Mari. The rulers of Mari held the title "King of Mari, Tuttul and the land of Hana". Since Mari was abandoned after its destruction by Hammurabi in c. 1759 BC (middle chronology) and Tuttul certainly was not part of the territories of the new state, the location of Khana is identified with the territories around Mari. Its capital Terqa was located 45 km north of Mari below the junction of Khabur River, roughly at the site of the modern Syrian town of Asharah.

History 
An independent kingdom under the leadership of Mari, the kingdom fell to the Old Babylonian Empire when Hammurabi destroyed Mari.

During the reign of the Babylonian king Abieshu (c. 1711-1684 BC) Babylonia lost its territories on the middle Euphrates where the kingdom of Hana was formed. Its capital Terqa was a former chief district town from the time of the last ruler of Mari, Zimrilim (1775-1761 BC). No direct evidence is available on the relationship of the new state and its kings with the last Babylonian rulers from the First Dynasty. The kingdom was probably conquered around the middle of the 15th century BC by the Hurrian kingdom of Mitanni.

The Hanaeans 

The Hanaeans were a nomadic tribal confederacy based around the middle Euphrates on the Syrian-Iraqi border. The Hanaean people led a semi-nomadic life characterized by seasonal movement of the sheep herds, never too far from the rivers and watering places, returning to their settlements for the harvest season. Based on onomastic evidence they were related to the other West Semitic peoples known as the Amorites, such as the Benjaminites, Rabbians and Habiru, originally coming from the deserts of Syria. The contact with the settled population leads to gradual transformation of the population into more settled rural communities.

The history of the Hanaeans is closely linked to the kingdom of Mari. They were strongly presented in the Euphrates and Khabur valleys. Records indicate that the area around Terqa could muster several thousand in times of need. The Hanaeans were widely used as soldiers by the rulers of Mari after their subduing by king Iakhdunlim. Within the armed forces of Mari they were grouped by clans of which about ten are known.

The Kassite domination 

There is some evidence about a link between the kingdom of Hana and the Kassites who came to dominate Babylonia in the following centuries. From the preserved list of rulers of Khana the name of one king, Khashtiliash, notably suggests a Kassite origin. There is also a Kassite element in the name of a canal dug by one of the other rulers.

One dedicatory inscription preserved in later copies records the return of Marduk’s statue from Hana by Agum II (Agum-Kakrime), a later Kassite king, most probably the first to rule over most of Babylonia (c.1570 BC). The part of the inscription that mentions Hana reads:

 I sent to the distant land, to the land of the Haneans and they conducted Marduk and Sarpanitu back to me. I returned Marduk and Sarpanitu, the ones who love my reign, to the Esagil and Babylon. I returned them to the temple that Shamash had confirmed to me in my investigation.

Even if the text does not convey clearly the relationship between the Kassite Agum II and "the Haneans" at that point, it nevertheless links Hana with the sack of Babylonia by the Hittite king Mursili I in c.1595 BC and the subsequent takeover by the Kassite dynasty in Babylonia. It is possible that after the initial clashes with Babylon's Samsuiluna, the Kassites, originally coming from the Zagros Mountains, withdrew north occupying and imposing control over middle Euphrates including the lands of Khana. It is also reasonable to assume some sort of cooperation between the Hittite and Khana as the invading armies of Murshilish I must have passed through its territories. Such alliance may have facilitated the seizing of power in Babylon by the Kassites some years after the Hittite retreat.

References 

States and territories established in the 18th century BC
Ancient Mesopotamia
Bronze Age Asia
Semitic-speaking peoples
Ancient peoples